Labadie can refer to:

People
 Marquis de Labadie (1698-1815), French Buccaneer, Compte de Cap-Francais, Saint Domingue (Haiti)
 Jean de Labadie (1610–1674), French Reformed Pietist
 Joseph Labadie (1850–1933), American labor organizer, anarchist, social activist, printer, publisher, essayist and poet
 Jean-Michel Labadie (born 1974), French bassist
 Joss Labadie (born 1990), English footballer

Places
 Labadee (also Labadie), a Haitian port town named after the French Marquis de La'Badie, a 17th-century resident trademarkedin English by Carnival Cruise Corporation.
 Labadie, Missouri, a US unincorporated community named after hunter Sylvester Labaddie, Jr.